The Ministry of Tourism and Lands is the central government ministry of Sri Lanka responsible for land and parliamentary reforms. The ministry is responsible for formulating and implementing national policy on lands and other subjects which come under its purview. The current Minister of Tourism and Lands is Harin Fernando. The ministry's secretary is W.A. Chulananda Perera.

Ministers
The Minister of Tourism and Lands is a member of the Cabinet of Sri Lanka.

Secretaries

References

External links
 

1931 establishments in Ceylon
Tourism and Lands
Sri Lanka
Tourism and Lands